Russell Muir (born 12 July 1954) is  a former Australian rules footballer who played with North Melbourne and Essendon in the Victorian Football League (VFL).

Notes

External links 		
		
Russell Muir's profile at Essendonfc.com		
		
		
		
		
Living people		
1954 births		
		
Australian rules footballers from Victoria (Australia)		
North Melbourne Football Club players		
Essendon Football Club players
Strathmore Football Club players